Haizhou (海州) may refer to:

Jiangsu
Haizhou District, Lianyungang, in Jiangsu, China
Hai Prefecture, a prefecture between the 6th and 20th centuries in modern Jiangsu, China

Liaoning
Haizhou District, Fuxin, in Liaoning, China
Haicheng, Liaoning, in China, known in the Ming Dynasty as Haizhou Garrison